Chilostoma planospira is a species of medium-sized, air-breathing, land snail, a terrestrial pulmonate gastropod mollusk in the family Helicidae, the true snails.

Anatomy

These snails create and use love darts.

Taxonomy
Subspecies:
 Chilostoma planospira benedictum
 Chilostoma planospira macrostoma
 Chilostoma planospira occultatum
 Chilostoma planospira planospira
 Chilostoma planospira setulosum

References

External links
 Species summary at: AnimalBase
 Image of live animal at: Natura Mediterraneo
 Taxonomy at: Uniprot

Chilostoma
Gastropods described in 1832